Vahit Melih Halefoğlu (19 November 1919 – 20 January 2017) was a Turkish politician and diplomat.

Following his education at the School of Political Science in Ankara University in 1942 he entered the Ministry of Foreign Affairs. Between 1962 and 1983, Halefoğlu served as ambassador in Beirut (1962–1965), Kuwait City (1964–1965), Moscow (1965–1966, 1982–1983), The Hague (1966–1970) and Bonn (1972–1982).

After the general elections held in 1983, Turgut Özal appointed him Minister of Foreign Affairs from outside of the parliament. At the intermediate general elections of 1986, he was elected deputy of Ankara from the Motherland Party (ANAP). He did not stand for election in the 1987 general elections and ended his political career.

Personal life
Halefoğlu was married to Zehra Bereket. Her father, Suphi Bereket, was the first President of the Syrian Federation.

Halefoğlu died on 20 January 2017 at the age of 97. He was interred at Zincirlikuyu Cemetery following the religious funeral service in Teşvikiye Mosque.

See also
 List of Turkish diplomats

References

 Biyografi.net - Biography of Vahit Halefoğlu

1919 births
2017 deaths
20th-century Turkish diplomats
Ambassadors of Turkey to Kuwait
Ministers of Foreign Affairs of Turkey
Motherland Party (Turkey) politicians
People from Antakya
Ankara University Faculty of Political Sciences alumni
Ambassadors of Turkey to West Germany
Ambassadors of Turkey to the Soviet Union
Ambassadors of Turkey to the Netherlands
Ambassadors of Turkey to Lebanon
Deputies of Ankara
Members of the 45th government of Turkey
Burials at Zincirlikuyu Cemetery
Commanders Crosses of the Order of Merit of the Federal Republic of Germany